Adriana Gerši (born 26 June 1976) is a former professional tennis player from the Czech Republic.

She reached her career-high singles ranking on 23 July 1997, as the world No. 48, and her career-high doubles ranking on 14 October 1996, as No. 165.

In her career, Gerši won one singles title on the WTA Tour, beating Marie-Gayanay Mikaelian in the final of the tournament of Basel, Switzerland.

Personal
Mother Ludmila is a teacher, father Ivan is a businessman. Adriana married former ATP player David Rikl on 14 June 2003. They are living in Naples, Florida, and have three children.

WTA career finals

Singles: 1 (1 title)

ITF Circuit finals

Singles: 8 (5–3)

Doubles: 3 (2–1)

External links

 
 
 
 
 

1976 births
Living people
Czech female tennis players
Olympic tennis players of the Czech Republic
People from Šternberk
Tennis players at the 2000 Summer Olympics
Sportspeople from the Olomouc Region